Wiyot (also Wishosk) or Soulatluk (lit. 'your jaw') is an Algic language spoken by the Wiyot people of Humboldt Bay, California. The language's last native speaker, Della Prince, died in 1962.

Wiyot, along with its geographical neighbor, the Yurok language, were first identified as relatives of the Algonquian languages by Edward Sapir in 1913, though this classification was disputed for decades in what came to be known as the Ritwan controversy. Due to the enormous geographical separation of Wiyot and Yurok from all other Algonquian languages, the validity of their genetic link was hotly contested by leading Americanist linguists; as Ives Goddard put it, the issue "has profound implications for the prehistory of North America". However, by the 1950s, the genetic relationship between the Algonquian languages and Wiyot and Yurok had been established to the satisfaction of most, if not all, researchers, giving rise to the term Algic to refer to the Algonquian languages together with Wiyot and Yurok.

The Wiyot Tribal Government is fostering a revival of the language through videos, online dictionaries, and an annual Wiyot language calendar.

Phonology

Consonants
Karl V. Teeter published the first modern descriptive grammar of Wiyot in 1964. His data, supplied by Della Prince soon before her death, was crucial to the establishment of the genetic relationship between Algonquin and Wiyot, and effectively ended the scholarly conflict surrounding the issue. All of the linguistic data below comes from his work, published by the University of California Press.

The consonants of Wiyot, as recorded by Teeter, are given in this chart, with a Practical Orthography in boldface and the IPA equivalents in brackets.

 The grapheme  is used for the fricative  word-initially and for the stop  otherwise.

Vowels

Syllables

Wiyot syllables always begin with consonants or consonant clusters, which are followed by a vowel. This vowel may be long or short. If the vowel is short, the syllable must end in the same consonant that begins the next syllable. Therefore, all non-final syllables are heavy, acquiring either a CVV or CVC structure. Word final syllables may or may not be heavy.

These syllable-final consonants are lengthened in speech, but do not appear as doubled letters in transcription. For example, in the word , meaning 'flounder', the 'l' is lengthened. Thus, the first syllable ends with 'l', and the second begins with 'l', and both syllables are considered heavy.

Teeter describes the "weight" of Wiyot syllables as one of the language's most salient features for speakers of English. He adds that voiced sounds tend to be exceptionally long in spoken Wiyot, a feature that adds to the perceived phonological heaviness of the language.

Pitch accent

In speech, Wiyot words are grouped into pitch accent phrases, which are separated by commas when written. Within these phrases, regular patterns of syllable stress and vowel length emerge. Stress, pitch and vowel length increase gradually from the beginning of the accent phrase until the culminative syllable in the accent phrase is reached, after which pitch precipitously drops, except when it is the final syllable of the accent phrase. In such a situation, the accent phrase would end on a high pitch.

The vowel of the culminative syllable bears either an acute or grave accent, the latter indicating a high pitch, and the former a high pitch which rapidly falls. The grave accent appears only when the culminative syllable is the final syllable of a breath group, which are groups of accent phrases.

The ends of breath groups are marked by periods, and are notably lower in relative pitch. Accent phrases towards the end of a breath group follow the same pattern of gradual lengthening and pitch increase, though the relative pitch is lower with respect to the preceding accent phrases. Breath groups end with a general weakening of articulatory force, which is followed by a noticeable interval of silence.

Despite the intricacies of pitch involved in Wiyot, the total pitch range of the spoken language is only a fraction of that of English, for example.

Example

'She began to throw aside the boards of the house, thinking in vain, 'I'll take that man back.' She never took him back.'

This fragment of Wiyot narration consists of two breath groups: the first contains five accent phrases, the second contains just one. The first accent phrase of the first breath group, carries the stress on the fourth syllable. The vowel of this 'culminative syllable', an 'e', carries an acute accent and is pronounced at a higher pitch than any other in the phrase. It is also lengthened relative to the other vowels in the phrase. After this culminative syllable, pitch and length decrease rapidly through the end of the accent phrase.

The second breath group contains just one accent phrase, . Here, the culminative syllable comes at the end of the accent phrase, indicating that pitch and length increase through the phrase until the final vowel, which starts on a high pitch that rapidly falls. This articulation is indicated with a grave accent over the 'i'. These accents only appears when the culminative syllable is the last syllable of a breath group, as in this example.

Processes

Teeter recorded many morphonemic processes that Wiyot words and phrases undergo. A few are listed below.

In the example , 'I don't see it',  follows the negating element , and itself conveys no meaning.

When any two vowels, or any three consonants that cannot occur as a phonological cluster, are combined due to morphological construction, the general tendency is for the second element to be eliminated. This is not true in the case of a laryngeal combining with a consonant cluster, in that order. In such a situation, the initial laryngeal element is eliminated.

Morphology
Wiyot is a highly synthetic, agglutinative language. Words or, more specifically, accent phrases, are formed by joining stems and affixes. Wiyot employs both prefixation and suffixation, meaning that affixes appear both before and after stems. Both verb and noun forms are constructed this way, though the particulars of each system are different.

Verb morphology

Stems
Stems are non-affixal morphemes, and can appear individually or as compounds. Their compound, 'go out', is also a stem.

Stems are either initial or medial. Initial stems may appear, as their name implies, as the first or only stems in a given word. Most stems belong to this class. , for example, is the initial stem in the above-mentioned compound . All initial stems start with a consonant.

Medial stems may not appear as the initial or sole stem in a word, and therefore must be combined with an initial. Medial stems may also occur as the second member of a compound with a special initial . This compound has essentially the same meaning as the medial itself.

Affixes
Wiyot affixes are classified as either derivational, inflectional or syntactic.

Derivational affixes are attached to stems and serve to classify them. Together, stems and derivational affixes form 'themes', which can be further modified by inflectional and syntactic affixes. 
The stem , meaning 'laugh', may take the derivational affix  and become , or 'laugh at'. There are many derivational affixes, most of which correspond to a complicated set of rules: stems can belong to one of eleven categories that determines which set of derivational affixes it may take. Therefore, to form an impersonal transitive verb theme like , for example, there are 10 other possible affixes that occur with stems from other categories. Furthermore, certain derivational affixes occur only when affixed to specific stems.

Inflectional affixes encode the subject and object of the theme. Wiyot makes a sharp distinction between definite and indefinite subjects, and each of these classes has its own set of inflectional affixes. Certain classes of Wiyot verbs can also take benefactive and instrumental affixes. The benefactive characterizes the verb as being done to a third person object for the benefit of a second object. Instrumental affixes convey that action is performed using a device of some kind. Instrumental and benefactive affixes directly encode for the subject of the verb and thus do not appear with inflectional affixes for subject. Therefore, the most inflectional affixes a verb can possibly take is three.
Inflectional affixes can be either terminal or nonterminal in nature. Terminal affixes, when added to verb or noun themes, can complete words, while nonterminal affixes require additional affixation.

Syntactic affixes, many of which are prefixes, also known as preverbs, are affixed to verb themes and often convey aspectual information. Verbs form can take up to four preverbs, which appear in a fixed order according to their syntactic class. There are nine classes in total, with the lower numbers appearing earlier in the verb form.

Some examples of preverbs include:

Class I: , the cessative aspect.  'They just got through eating'

Class II: , the perfect tense.  'He had come down.'

Class VI: , the emphatic negative.  'They never eat.'

The position numbers fix the relative positions of these preverbs when they appear in combination. Thus, to create a perfect cessative construction using the inflected verb theme ,  would have to precede  to form , 'He had just come down'.

Preverbs, in addition to aspect, often convey tense and mood.

Noun morphology

Derivation
Wiyot nouns are often derived from verbs, and typically serve to fill out and expound upon the various relationships and categories already expressed in verb forms. Like verbs, nouns consist of stems and affixes.

Nominalization is the most important process in Wiyot for deriving nouns. Typically, nouns are created from verbs by adding one of twelve nominalizing affixes to the verb complex. ( is also the most common third person inflectional suffix in Wiyot, and both the nominalizing and inflectional suffixes appear in the same position. This gives rise to some degree of morphological ambiguity in many cases.)

 is a nominalized form meaning 'swan'; it is derived from the homonymous verb meaning 'he makes it dry'.

 means 'robin', and is derived from the homonymous verb meaning 'he is dry on the eyes'.

A less ambiguous, more obviously derived example employs the nominalizing suffix : , meaning 'football', is the nominalized form of the verb meaning 'it goes with a kicking motion'.

Inflection

Nouns are inflected for four categories: the subordinative, possessive, locative and vocative.

Subordinative inflection, indicated by a suffix added to a noun theme, expresses that the inflected noun belongs to another nominal concept- a person, perhaps. Nouns can also be subordinated to an indefinite nominal concept using the suffix . An example of a definite subordinate inflection is the noun form , meaning 'his teeth', which consists of the subordinate noun theme  and the inflectional suffix .

Possessive inflection is conveyed using prefixes. There are three different sets of possessive prefixes, though the majority of Wiyot nouns are inflected using only one of these. This most productive set distinguishes three persons: first- ; second- ; third- . The final  seen in these stems is often dropped in spoken Wiyot. , meaning 'your strawberries', includes the second person pronoun from this first set, .

The second set applies only to inalienable nouns, or nouns that must be possessed, such as body parts. Curiously, the words for 'wood' and 'enemy' belong in this category of Wiyot nouns, as well. The set only distinguishes two persons: first- ; second- . Third person possession of inalienable nouns tends to be conveyed using a subordinative derivational suffix. Pronouns from this second set tend to replace the initial consonants of the themes they are affixed to. Within the second set, there is also an indefinite or absolutive prefix .

The third set is limited largely to kinship terms and the word for 'nose'. In the third set, the second person possessive is articulated by aspirating the initial phoneme of the noun theme. Thus, meaning 'maternal aunt', becomes  , 'your maternal aunt'. There is no marking of a first person possessive in this category, and, as in the second set, a third person possessive is indicated by the use of a subordinative derivational suffix.

Locative inflection is indicated by one of two affixes: the suffix  and the prefix . Both have general meanings which can be translated as 'at, on, near, above, over, under, behind, etc.'.
'On your teeth' is expressed  ( appears after all prefixes that are followed by b or w).

There is a single vocative prefix, that occurs with kinship terms.

Pronouns
Wiyot personal pronouns are generally used to emphasize the subjects or objects indicated in verb forms. The personal pronouns distinguish three persons, each with a singular and plural variant. Thus, this set of pronouns is frequently used to clarify number in verb forms, as Wiyot verbs themselves do not. The first person plural pronoun , for example, is often employed alongside verb complexes that are inflected for the indefinite third person or impersonal, such as in the example , meaning 'we saw'. Here,  is inflected for an indefinite third person, though  unambiguously expresses 'we'.

Syntax

Verbs are the core of Wiyot grammar, and verbal phrases are the most important part of Wiyot sentences. Verb complexes- inflected verb themes combined with syntactic affixes- form sentences along with nominal phrases. Verb phrases themselves frequently encode subject, object and instrumental information, but the actual entities being signified are rarely named. Noun and pronoun phrases serve to provide this information.  The transitivity of the verb complex determines the classes of noun forms that may occur in the sentence; nominal phrases serve to specify subject and object information, so intransitive verbs, which lack inflection for object, would not appear in combination with a nominal phrase for the object.

Preverb sequences, which consist of up to four syntactic prefixes, are the first step in expanding the derived and inflected verbal form. A great deal of morphological information can be conveyed in this prefixed element: aspect, mode and tense are all commonly expressed using preverbs, as is quantitative information and polarity.

Nominal forms round out and complete Wiyot sentences, frequently serving as adjuncts to verbal phrases. Nouns are categorized as either principal or modifying phrases. Principal phrases include nominalized forms and possessive phrases, while modifying phrases typically refer to a time or place in which a verbal phrase occurs. For example,  is a principal nominal form meaning 'large, longish object';  is a modifying nominal form meaning 'right now'.

Pronominal phrases further elucidate verbal complexes, and can be employed as noun forms themselves. , for example, can take the nominalizing affix  and be treated as a nominal phrase.

These elements are combined relatively freely to form sentences; the limited corpus of Wiyot text indicates a wide variety of syntactic organizations. Most Wiyot sentences are in the indicative mood, as are all of the examples given below.

. 'That white man is surprised about something'.  is a nominal phrase meaning 'something'; it serves as the object of the sentence.  is also a nominal phrase and serves to clarify the subject of the verbal phrase.  is a demonstrative article meaning 'that';  means 'white man'. Finally,  is a verb, 'to be surprised', inflected for the definite third person.

Revitalization

With the death of Della Prince in 1962, Wiyot became an extinct language. However, in recent years, the federally recognized Wiyot tribe has been attempting to revitalize the language. The tribe advertises language courses on its website and publishes Wiyot texts for distribution, such as a calendar. As of 2014, Wiyot does not appear to have any fluent speakers.

References

Bibliography
 Campbell, Lyle. (1997). American Indian languages: The historical linguistics of Native America. New York: Oxford University Press.
 Dixon, Roland; & Kroeber, Alfred L. (1913). New linguistic families in California. American Anthropologist, 5, 1-26.
 Elsasser, Albert B. (1978). Wiyot. In R. F. Heizer (Ed.), California (pp. 153–163). Handbook of North American Indians (Vol. 8) (W. C. Sturtevant (Ed.)). Washington, D. C.: Smithsonian Institution.
 Goddard, Ives. (1975). Algonquian, Wiyot, and Yurok: Proving a distant genetic relationship. In M. D. Kinkade, K. L. Hale, & O. Werner (Eds.), Linguistics and anthropology in honor of C. F. Voegelin (pp. 249–262). Lisse: Peter de Ridder Press.
 Goddard, Ives. (1979). Comparative Algonquian. In L. Campbell & M. Mithun (Eds.), The languages of native America: Historical and comparative assessment (pp. 70–132). Austin: University of Texas Press.
 Goddard, Ives. (1990). Algonquian linguistic change and reconstruction. In P. Baldi (Ed.), Linguistic change and reconstruction methodology (pp. 99–114). Berlin: Mouton de Gruyter.
 Golla, Victor. (2011). California Indian Languages. Berkeley: University of California Press. .
 Haas, Mary R. (1958). Algonkian-Ritwan: The end of a controversy. International Journal of American Linguistics, 24, 159-173.

 Michelson, Truman. 1914. Two alleged Algonquian languages of California. American Anthropologist, 16, 361-367.
 Michelson, Truman. 1915. Rejoinder (to Edward Sapir). American Anthropologist, 17, 4-8.
 Mithun, Marianne. (1999). The languages of Native North America. Cambridge: Cambridge University Press.  (hbk); .
 Reichard, Gladys. 1925. Wiyot grammar and texts. Berkeley, Calif.: University of California Press.
 Sapir, Edward. 1913. Wiyot and Yurok, Algonkin languages of California. American Anthropologist, 15, 617-646.
 Sapir, Edward. (1915)a. Algonkin languages of California: A reply.  American Anthropologist, 17, 188-194.
 Sapir, Edward. (1915)b. Epilogue.  American Anthropologist, 17, 198.
 Teeter, Karl V. (1964)a. Algonquian languages and genetic relationship. In Proceedings of the ninth international congress of linguists (pp. 1026–1033). The Hague: Mouton.
 Teeter, Karl V. (1964)b. The Wiyot language. University of California publications in linguistics. Berkeley: University of California Press.

External links
Wiyot Tribe - Language
Language Geek: Wiyot Fonts
Wiyot language overview at the Survey of California and Other Indian Languages
OLAC resources in and about the Wiyot language

	 
Wiyot and Hupa Language Bibliography

	
 "It is the desire of the Live Your Language Alliance to hear and speak the traditional languages of the Tolowa, Karuk, Yurok, Hupa, Tsnungwe, Wiyot, Mattole, and Wailaki."

Algic languages
Extinct languages of North America
Indigenous languages of California
Wiyot tribe
1962 disestablishments in California
Languages extinct in the 1960s